The 1982 Lake Waco Murders refers to the deaths of three teenagers (two females, one male) near Lake Waco in Waco, Texas, in July 1982. The police investigation and criminal trials that followed the murders lasted for more than a decade and resulted in the execution of one man, David Wayne Spence, and life prison sentences for two other men allegedly involved in the crime, Anthony and Gilbert Melendez. A fourth suspect, Muneer Mohammad Deeb, was eventually released after spending several years in prison.

Murders
On July 13, 1982, two fishermen discovered the bodies of Jill Montgomery, 17, Raylene Rice, 17, and Kenneth Franks, 18, in Speegleville Park, near Lake Waco. Franks' body was found propped against a tree, with sunglasses over his eyes. All three victims had been repeatedly stabbed, and both of the women's throats had been slashed. There was also evidence that the women had been sexually assaulted.

Investigation
The investigation was initially headed by Lieutenant Marvin Horton of the Waco police department, with assistance from Detective Ramon Salinas and Patrolman Mike Nicoletti. Truman Simons, who was with the Waco police department and had been one of the first respondents on the crime scene, also assisted the investigation in an informal capacity.

Initially, the investigation revealed several different possible suspects, including James Russell Bishop  and Terry Harper, residents who had been tied to the area at the time of the crime. However, both men were found to have credible alibis (Harper's was later proven false when Spence's attorneys investigated it). In September that year, the investigation began to stall and was marked as "suspended." Simons, who had taken a significant personal interest in the case, requested that he be given permission to continue investigating the case, which he was subsequently granted.

Within a few days, the first arrest in the case was made. Muneer Mohammad Deeb, a local gas station owner, was known to have had a contentious relationship with Kenneth Franks. The two had engaged in verbal confrontations on multiple occasions. Following the murders, he had even commented to two young women that he committed the murders. After one of the women reported this comment to the police, Deeb was quickly arrested and submitted to a polygraph test, which he passed. Subsequently, Deeb was released for lack of evidence.

The case languished for nearly a year until the work of Simons and others had produced enough evidence again to arrest Deeb and three alleged accomplices in the plot. Deeb had had a life insurance policy for one employee at his convenience store who bore a striking resemblance to Jill Montgomery. Simons hypothesized that Deeb had hired David Wayne Spence to murder her and that Spence and two friends, Anthony and Gilbert Melendez, had seen the victims and mistaken Montgomery for the target. They speculated that the other two victims had been murdered because they were witnesses.

Trials
Deeb, Spence, and the Melendez brothers were indicted late 1983. District Attorney Vic Feazell, whose office had been instrumental in continuing to pursue new evidence in the case, would manage the prosecution against the accused. Spence and both Melendez brothers were, at the time, already serving prison sentences for various crimes.

The evidence against the men largely consisted of testimony provided by other inmates, who claimed that the defendants had admitted to their involvement in the killings in private discussions, as well as confessions made by Anthony and Gilbert Melendez. Also considered was the confession Deeb had made to the two young women about his involvement in the killings and the life insurance policy he had taken out for his employee. Bite marks on the victims were also presented as evidence of Spence’s involvement.

The trials began in May, with testimony from dental specialists supplementing the evidence that the prison witnesses had provided. In June, Anthony Melendez pleaded guilty to the crimes and was sentenced to life imprisonment. Spence’s case was badly damaged by Melendez’ confession, which played a key role in his eventual conviction in July 1984. Unlike Melendez, Spence was sentenced to death for his involvement in the killings.

In January 1985, Gilbert Melendez also pleaded guilty to the murders and agreed to testify against Deeb. Like his brother, he received a term of life imprisonment in exchange for this confession. Gilbert Melendez died in prison in 1998 from AIDS-related complications. Anthony Melendez died in prison on January 13, 2017.

Deeb, who had continued to protest his innocence, was found guilty of instigating the murders, and on March 14, he was sentenced to death by lethal injection.

Appeals

Spence and Deeb maintained their innocence following their convictions, and both men sought appeals. In 1991, Deeb’s appeal was granted when the Court of Criminal Appeals “ruled that the testimony of a jail inmate should not have been allowed” in his initial trial. Deeb won his new trial in January 1993 and was subsequently released from prison. Those who had been involved in the initial prosecution were stunned. Former McLennan County District Attorney Vic Feazell, who had prosecuted Deeb, stated following the trial, "I am perplexed and bewildered, as I'm sure a lot of people are. But in my mind, this doesn't change anything as far as Mr. Deeb's culpability goes."

David Wayne Spence’s appeals were unsuccessful, and in April 1997, he was executed for his role in the killings.

Book and film
In 1986, true-crime writer Carlton Stowers published his account of the murders and police investigation surrounding the Lake Waco murders, Careless Whispers. The book focused heavily on Truman Simons’ involvement in producing the evidence which led to the convictions.

The incident also inspired a made-for-TV adaptation, Sworn to Vengeance, starring Robert Conrad as a fictionalized version of Simons. The film aired on CBS in 1993.

Controversy
Following the convictions of Spence and Deeb, some began to question the substance of the evidence on which the convictions had been based and the methods through which it had been obtained. Forensic odontologist Homer Campbell was proven to have made false assessments at around the same time. When a blind panel examined the alleged bite marks and a mold of Spence's teeth, two matched them to a Kansas housewife, and the other three could not match them to anyone's teeth. Three of the seven people who said Spence confessed later stated that Simons had offered them privileges to secure their testimony, including one that said he had fed her info on what to say. Spence's lawyers also discovered an alternate suspect in Terry Harper, a local thug with a history of knife-related offenses. Witnesses testified to seeing Harper in the park on the night of the murders, and others claimed he had boasted of committing the murders. Also, one of the victims, Kenneth Franks, was later alleged to have been an associate of Harper's in the drug trade. When Harper was interviewed by Spence's lawyers, he claimed that he was at home watching Dynasty; records showed that Dynasty did not air that night. Brian Pardo, a wealthy Texas businessman, met Spence a few months before his execution and, on becoming convinced of his innocence, launched a campaign to delay his death sentence so that a new trial could be commenced. His efforts were unsuccessful, but they brought attention to the case following Spence’s execution.

Bob Herbert wrote a series of articles for The New York Times in 1997, with headlines such as “The Wrong Man” and “The Impossible Crime,” in which he claimed that the case had been “cobbled […] together from the fabricated and often preposterous testimony of inmates who were granted all manner of favors in return.”

See also
 Capital punishment in Texas
 Capital punishment in the United States
 List of people executed in Texas, 1990–1999

Further reading
 Michael Hall, "The Murders at the Lake", Texas Monthly, April 2014

References

External links
 
 
 

History of Waco, Texas
Murder in Texas
1982 murders in the United States
Crimes in Texas
1982 in Texas
July 1982 events in the United States
July 1982 crimes